Joaquín Zeballos Machado (born 30 November 1996) is a Uruguayan professional footballer who plays as a forward for Montevideo City Torque.

Career
Zeballos is a youth academy graduate of Deportivo Maldonado. On 5 October 2020, he joined Barcelona B on a season long loan deal from Girona.

On 27 August 2021, Montevideo City Torque announced the signing of Zeballos on a permanent contract until the end of December 2024.

References

External links

1996 births
Living people
People from Maldonado Department
Association football forwards
Uruguayan footballers
Uruguayan expatriate footballers
Deportivo Maldonado players
Huracán F.C. players
Juventud de Las Piedras players
Girona FC players
FC Barcelona Atlètic players
Santiago Wanderers footballers
Uruguayan Primera División players
Uruguayan Segunda División players
Segunda División players
Segunda División B players
Primera B de Chile players
Expatriate footballers in Chile
Expatriate footballers in Spain
Uruguayan expatriate sportspeople in Spain